Euphaedra francina, the magnificent forester, is a butterfly in the family Nymphalidae. It is found in Sierra Leone, Liberia, Ivory Coast and Ghana. The habitat consists of primary wet forests.

Description
 
E. francina Godt. (42 d) varies but little and is a very easily recognized species. The wings are black above, at the base and hindmargin of the forewing and on the hindwing to beyond the middle a fine (greenish) blue with black spots in the cell (and at the base of cellule lb) on the forewing and a very large, rounded black spot at the end of the cell on the hindwing; the broad black marginal band is nearly always ornamented  with large, sharply marked, rounded blue submarginal spots; the subapical band of the forewing is narrow, orange-yellow above, indistinct or whitish yellow beneath; the fringes are dotted with white at the ends of the interneural folds. The under surface is uniform greenish, more or less suffused with yellow or brown-yellow, 
with 2 or 3 black dots in the cells, but without distinct discal and submarginal spots; the hindwing at least in cellule 7 with the beginning of a narrow white median band, which is there bounded proximally by an angled black transverse streak. Sierra Leone.

Similar species
Other members of the Euphaedra ceres species group

Subspecies
Euphaedra francina francina (Sierra Leone, Liberia)
Euphaedra francina exuberans Collins & Larsen, 2005 (Ivory Coast, western Ghana)

References

Butterflies described in 1824
francina